William J. Hosey (May 5, 1854 – September 10, 1937) was an American politician and the 20th Mayor of Fort Wayne, Indiana. Between 1906 and 1935 he served four non-consecutive terms of office.

History
He was born in New Orleans, Louisiana a year after his parents, Michael and Jean Frayne Hosey, immigrated to the United States from County Wexford in Ireland. In 1858, the four-year-old Hosey moved with his family to Mount Vernon, Ohio, where his father took a job as a gardener on the estate of Colonel Jesse P. Buckingham.  (This may instead have been the estate of future General Catharinus P. Buckingham.)

At age 13, three years after his father died from malaria, extreme poverty forced William Hosey to drop out of a Catholic grammar school to work at Mount Vernon-based C & C Cooper Company machine shop. Five years later, William, his mother and older brother Lawrence moved to Fort Wayne, where William took a job as a machinist for the Pennsylvania Railroad. Lawrence died of pneumonia two years later. William worked at the railroad for 34 years.

During this time, William attended night classes to finish his education. He studied literature and philosophy.

References

Mayors of Fort Wayne, Indiana
People from Mount Vernon, Ohio
Indiana Democrats
1854 births
1937 deaths
People from New Orleans
Pennsylvania Railroad people